
Year 673 (DCLXXIII) was a common year starting on Saturday (link will display the full calendar) of the Julian calendar. The denomination 673 for this year has been used since the early medieval period, when the Anno Domini calendar era became the prevalent method in Europe for naming years.

Events 
 By place 

 Europe 
 Spring – King Chlothar III of Neustria and Burgundy dies after a reign of 16 years, in which he has been a puppet — roi fainéant — of the Neustrian mayor of the palace, Ebroin. He is buried in the Basilica of St. Denis, and succeeded by his brother Theuderic III. 
 Burgundian nobles, under the leadership of bishop Leodegar and Adalrich, invite Childeric II to become king in Neustria and Burgundy. He invades Theuderic's kingdom and displaces his brother, becoming sole king of the Frankish Kingdom. 
 September 3 – King Wamba of the Visigoths puts down the revolt by Hilderic, governor of Nîmes and rival for the throne. He captures the rebel leaders, who are brought to trial and, for their crimes, scalped and imprisoned for life.

 Britain 

 King Frithuwold of Surrey flourishes under Mercian domination. The marriage of his daughter Osgyth to King Sighere of Essex breaks down. She desires the religious life, and flees the Essex court to the protection of bishop Bedwinus of North Elmham (Norfolk).
 King Domangart mac Domnaill of Dál Riata (Scotland) dies, and is succeeded by his nephew Máel Dúin mac Conaill. He probably submits to King Ecgfrith of Northumbria as his overlord. 
 July 4 – King Ecgberht I of Kent dies after a reign of nearly 9 years. He is succeeded by his brother Hlothhere.

 Asia 
 March 20 – Emperor Tenmu assumes the Chrysanthemum throne of Japan at the Palace of Kiyomihara, in Asuka.

 By topic 

 Religion 
 Æthelthryth, Anglo-Saxon princess, returns to East Anglia and founds the Abbey of Ely (Cambridgeshire). At about this time a small nunnery is also founded in her name, in Stow Green.
 The Council of Hertford is held and convened by Theodore of Tarsus, archbishop of Canterbury. The council makes canons for the English Church.

Births 
 Æthelburg, queen of Wessex (approximate date)
 Bede, Anglo-Saxon theologian and historian (or 672)
 Guthlac of Crowland, Anglo-Saxon hermit (d. 714)
 Pega, Anglo-Saxon anchoress (approximate date)
 Zhang Jiuling, chancellor of the Tang Dynasty (d. 740)

Deaths 
 July 4 – Ecgberht, king of Kent
 August 18 – Kim Yu-shin, general of Silla (b. 595)
 Agilbert, Anglo-Saxon bishop (approximate date)
 Chlothar III, king of Neustria and Burgundy (b. 652)
 Domangart mac Domnaill, king of Dál Riata (Scotland)
 Remaclus, Frankish missionary (approximate date)
 Yan Liben, painter and official of the Tang Dynasty
 Ziyad ibn Abi Sufyan, Muslim general

References